The Wandandian are an Aboriginal Australian people of the South Coast of New South Wales with connections to the Yuin and Tharawal nations.

Country
The Wandandian lands extended over an estimated  from Ulladulla to the Shoalhaven River and Nowra. To their south were the Walbanga. The tribes to their west were the Ngunawal and Walgalu.

People
Norman Tindale cites a report by a Richard Dawsey reprinted in one of the early volumes edited by Edward Micklethwaite Curr, regarding the tribes from Jervis Bay to Mount Dromedary, as referring to the Wandandian. According to this reference, the tribes divided themselves into two classes, the Piindri (tree climbers) and the Kathoongal (fishermen), and that according to their mythological lore the earth had been once devastated and had to be repopulated by people from the moon.

Aboriginal union organiser for the Builders Labourers Federation Kevin "Cookie" Cook was a Yuin and Wandandian man.

Some words
 barbatha or baiing (father)
 meunda or mane (mother)
 moomaga (white man)
 tchingar (starfish, hence "policeman", since like the marine animal, the latter seize and detain

Alternative names
 Tharumba
 Kurial-yuin (meaning "men of the north")
 Murraygaro
 Jervis Bay tribe

Notes

Citations

Sources

Aboriginal peoples of New South Wales
South Coast (New South Wales)